Henriciella marina is a Gram-negative, strictly aerobic and motile bacterium from the genus of Henriciella which has been isolated from the Sea of Japan from Korea.

References 

Caulobacterales
Bacteria described in 2009